This is a list of Apostolic Nuncios (a diplomatic ambassador from the Holy See) of Filipino origin.

Adolfo Tito Yllana
Current Post: Apostolic Nuncio to Israel, Apostolic Nuncio to Cyprus, and Apostolic Delegate to Jerusalem and Palestine
In current office since: 3 June 2021
Previous posts:
Apostolic Nuncio to Australia
Apostolic Nuncio to the Democratic Republic of the Congo
Apostolic Nuncio to Pakistan
Apostolic Nuncio to Papua New Guinea
Apostolic Nuncio to the Solomon Islands
Nuncio since:  13 December 2001

Francisco Padilla
Current Post: Apostolic Nuncio to Guatemala
In current office since: April 17, 2020
Previous Posts:
Apostolic Nuncio to Papua New Guinea, Solomon Islands and Timor-Leste
Apostolic Nuncio to Tanzania
Apostolic Nuncio to the State of Kuwait 
Apostolic Delegate to the Arabian Peninsula
Apostolic Nuncio to Bahrain and United Arab Emirates
Apostolic Nuncio to Yemen
Apostolic Nuncio to Qatar
Nuncio since: 1 Apr 2006 - Present

Osvaldo Padilla
Current post: (none)
In office since: N/A
Previous posts:
Apostolic Nuncio to Panama
Apostolic Nuncio to Sri Lanka
Apostolic Nuncio to Nigeria
Apostolic Nuncio to Costa Rica
Apostolic Nuncio to Korea and Mongolia (April 2008 - September 2017)
Nuncio since: 17 Dec 1990

Bernardito Auza
Current post: Apostolic Nuncio to Spain and Apostolic Nuncio to Andorra
In current office since: 1 October 2019
Previous posts:
Apostolic Nuncio to Haiti
Permanent Observer of the Holy See to the United Nations
Nuncio since: 8 May 2008

See also 

 Catholic Church in the Philippines
 List of Roman Catholic archdioceses
 List of Roman Catholic dioceses

References

External links
Catholic Hierarchy 
G Catholic 
Catholic Bishop's Conference of the Philippines

Catholic Church in the Philippines
Filipino Roman Catholic archbishops